Opa-locka station is a Tri-Rail commuter rail station in Opa-locka, Florida. Parking is available at this station, which is located near the intersection of Ali Baba Avenue and Sharazad Boulevard. The current station opened for service in 1996 directly adjacent to the former Opa-locka Seaboard Air Line Railway Station.

Historic station

The Seaboard Air Line Railroad depot in is located at 490 Ali Baba Avenue. Constructed in 1927, the station house is typical of the Moorish Revival architecture prevalent throughout the city of Opa-locka. On June 25, 1987, it was added to the U.S. National Register of Historic Places.

This property is part of the Opa-locka Thematic Resource Area, a multiple-property submission to the National Register.

Station layout
The station has two side platforms with a small parking lot and bus bays west of the southbound platform and a crossover accessing the northbound platform.

Gallery

References

External links

South Florida Regional Transportation Authority - Opa-locka station
Station from Google Maps Street View
 Dade County listings at National Register of Historic Places
 Opa-locka railroad station at Florida's Office of Cultural and Historical Programs

Tri-Rail stations in Miami-Dade County, Florida
Railway stations in the United States opened in 1995
Opa-locka, Florida
1995 establishments in Florida
Railway stations on the National Register of Historic Places in Florida
Seaboard Air Line Railroad stations
Railway stations in the United States opened in 1927
National Register of Historic Places in Miami-Dade County, Florida
Transportation buildings and structures in Miami-Dade County, Florida